Olivia Anna Cristina Llewellyn (born 1980) is an English actress, best known for her television appearances portraying Isabel Danforth in The Lizzie Borden Chronicles and Mina Harker in Penny Dreadful.

Career
Trained at the London Academy of Music and Dramatic Art, Llewellyn appeared in supporting roles in several television series and films before portraying Mina Harker in the Showtime series Penny Dreadful in 2014 and 2015, and Isabel Danforth in the Lifetime series The Lizzie Borden Chronicles in 2015.

Llewellyn has appeared onstage as Flaminia in Timon of Athens with the Royal National Theatre, as Luciana in The Comedy of Errors with the Royal Shakespeare Company and as Cecile De Volanges Les Liaisons dangereuses at the Playhouse Theatre in the West End.

Personal life
Born in 1980, Llewellyn is the daughter of Sir David St Vincent "Dai" Llewellyn, 4th Baronet and Vanessa Hubbard. She has a younger sister, Arabella (born 1983). Llewellyn also has several half- and step-siblings, including actresses Gabriella Wilde and Isabella Calthorpe.

References

External links
 
 Olivia Llewellyn at waringandmckenna.com

1980 births
Living people
English film actresses
English soap opera actresses
English stage actresses
English television actresses
21st-century English actresses
Alumni of the London Academy of Music and Dramatic Art
English people of Swedish descent
English people of Welsh descent